Micrometrus is a genus of surfperches native to the eastern Pacific Ocean.

Species
There are currently two recognized species in this genus:
 Micrometrus aurora (D. S. Jordan & C. H. Gilbert, 1880) (Reef perch)
 Micrometrus minimus (Gibbons, 1854) (Dwarf perch)

References

Embiotocidae
Marine fish genera